This is a list of number-one songs in the United States during the year 1942 according to The Billboard.

The National Best Selling Retail Records chart was the first to poll retailers nationwide on record sales. The chart was billed as a "trade service feature," based on the "10 best selling records of the past week" at a selection of national retailers from New York to Los Angeles.

Shown is a list of songs that topped the National Best Selling Retail Records chart in 1942.

See also
1942 in music

References

1942
 
1942 record charts